A list of rivers of Thuringia, Germany:

A    
Alster
Apfelstädt
Ascherbach
Auma

B
Biber
Bibra
Blambach
Bode
Breitenbach
Breitstrom

D
Dammbach
Deube
Dober
Dürrbach

E
Effelder
Eichbach
Ellenbach
Eller
Elschnitztalbach
Elte
Emse
Erbstrom
Erle

F
Felda
Freibach
Frieda

G
Gabelbach
Geislede
Gera
Geroder Eller
Gessenbach
Gleise
Göltzsch
Gönnerbach
Göritz
Gramme
Grumbach
Grümpen

H
Habergrund
Hädderbach
Hahle
Hasel
Helme
Herpf
Hörsel
Humbach, tributary of the Ilm
Humbach, tributary of the Schwarzbach

I
Ifta
Ilm
Itz

J
Jüchnitz
Jüchse

K
Katza
Kieselbach
Klettenberger Mühlgraben
Körnbach
Kotschau
Kupferbach

L
Laucha
Lauter
Lauterbach
Leina
Leine
Lempertsbach
Lengwitz
Leutra, a tributary of the Saale in the centre of Jena
Leutra, a tributary of the Saale in the district Maua of Jena
Lichte
Lichtenau
Linderbach
Lohme
Loquitz
Lossa
Lütsche
Lütsche-Flößgraben
Lutter

M
Madel
Magdel
Milz
Mühlwasser

N
Nahe
Nesse
Neubrunn
Notter

O
Oechse
Oelze
Ohne
Ohra
Orla

P
Pfitzbach
Piesau
Pleiße

R
Reichenbach
Retschenbach
Rettbach
Rinne
Rinnebach
Roda
Rodach
Rohrgraben
Rosabach
Rot, also called Roth
Röthen
Rottenbach, tributary of the Ilm
Rottenbach, tributary of the Rinne

S
Saar
Salza
Scherkonde
Schleuse
Schmale Gera
Schmalkalde
Schnauder
Schnellmannshäuser Bach
Schobse
Schorte
Schwarza, tributary of the Hasel
Schwarza, tributary of the Ilm
Schwarza, tributary of the Saale
Schwarzbach
Schweina
Seebach
Sieglitz
Sorbitz
Sormitz
Spitter
Spring
Sprotte
Steinach
Stille
Streu
Suhl, tributary of the Weihe
Suhl, tributary of the Werra
Sülze
Saale

T
Taft
Tannbach
Taubach
Thüringische Muschwitz
Tonna
Tonndorfbach
Töpener Bach or Töpenbach – alternative name of the Kupferbach
Truse

U
Uffe, former name of the Klettenberger Mühlgraben
Uffe, tributary of the Wieda
Ulster
Unstrut

V
Vesser
Vippach

W
Walkstrom
Weid
Weida
Weihe
Weilroder Eller
White Elster
Weißbach
Werra
Wethau
Wieda
Wilde Gera, a headstream of the Gera
Wilde Gera, a small arm of the Gera in Erfurt
Wilder Graben, tributary of the Nesse
Wilder Graben, tributary of the Seebach
Wipfra
Wipper
Wirrbach
Wisenta
Wohlrose
Wümbach
Wyhra

Z
Zahme Gera
Zaufensgraben
Zeilbach
Zeitzbach
Zimmerbach
Zorge

    

 
Thuringia-related lists
Thuringia